Diogo Vitor da Cruz (born 11 February 1997), known as Diogo Vitor, is a Brazilian footballer who plays as a forward for ASA.

Club career

Santos
Born in Coqueiral, Minas Gerais, Diogo Vitor joined Santos' youth setup in 2010, aged 12; he started his career as a left back, but was later converted to a forward. After progressing through the club's youth setup, he was promoted to the first team by manager Marcelo Fernandes in 2015, but was later demoted back to the under-20s after the arrival of Dorival Júnior.

In January 2016, Diogo Vitor failed to appear in the club's presentation, alleging a toothache. After finally returning to Peixe, he was assigned to the B-side.

On 5 June 2016 Diogo Vitor made his professional debut, coming on as a second-half substitute for Joel in a 3–0 home win against Botafogo for the Série A championship. After more indiscipline problems, he was demoted back to the B-side.

On 15 February 2018, Diogo Vitor renewed his contract until 2021, being definitely promoted to the main squad. On 4 March he scored his first professional goal, netting the equalizer in a 1–1 home draw against Corinthians.

Diogo Vitor made his Copa Libertadores debut on 5 April 2018, replacing Rodrygo in a 1–0 away win against Estudiantes. In March 2020, his contract was rescinded as a just cause, after he failed to appear at the club for the 2020 campaign.

Doping case
On 26 April 2018, Diogo Vitor was caught in a doping exam following a Campeonato Paulista match against Botafogo-SP in March; the prohibited substance was suspected to be cocaine. He returned to training in November 2019, after his 18-month suspension ended.

Career statistics

References

External links

1997 births
Living people
Sportspeople from Minas Gerais
Brazilian footballers
Association football forwards
Campeonato Brasileiro Série A players
Campeonato Brasileiro Série D players
Campeonato Paranaense players
Santos FC players
Maringá Futebol Clube players
Agremiação Sportiva Arapiraquense players